In Their Lives: Great Writers on Great Beatles Songs is a collection of essays in which twenty-nine authors and musicians discuss their favorite Beatles songs.  The book is edited by Andrew Blauner, and features an introductory note by Paul McCartney.

Essays

External links
 
 Goodreads
 Kirkus Reviews
 Poets & Writers
 Publishers Weekly
 San Diego Book Review
 The Washington Post

2017 non-fiction books
Books about the Beatles
Blue Rider Press books